G. gracilis may refer to:
 Galaxias gracilis, the dwarf inanga, a freshwater fish found in the North Island of New Zealand
 Galeus gracilis, the slender sawtail catshark, a shark found off northern Australia
 Galphimia gracilis, a plant species native to eastern Mexico
 Gastrocyathus gracilis, the New Zealand slender clingfish, a fish species
 Gastrotheca gracilis, a frog species found in Argentina and possibly Bolivia
 Gentianella gracilis, a plant species endemic to Ecuador
 Goodea gracilis, a fish species endemic to Mexico

Synonyms
 Gymnadenia gracilis var. keiskei, a synonym for Amitostigma keiskei, an orchid species

See also
 Gracilis (disambiguation)